John, Johnny, or Jon Hamilton may refer to:

Arts and entertainment
John R. Hamilton (architect), English architect
John McLure Hamilton (1853–1936), Anglo-American artist
John Hamilton (actor) (1887–1958), American actor
John F. Hamilton (1893–1967), American actor
John "Bugs" Hamilton (1911–1947), American trumpeter
John Hamilton (artist) (1919–1993), British army officer and artist
John R. Hamilton (photographer) (1923–1997), American photographer
John T. Hamilton (born 1963), American literary scholar and musician
Sterling Hayden (1916–1986), American actor who operated under the code name "John Hamilton" as an agent for the Office of Strategic Services in World War II

Military 
John Hamilton (Jacobite) (died 1691), Irish military officer in the Williamite War in Ireland
John Hamilton (Royal Navy officer) (1714–1755), British naval officer
John Hamilton (British Army officer) (1724–1802), British Army officer who served in North America
John Hamilton (American Revolution) (died 1816), Loyalist military officer in the American Revolutionary War
Sir John Hamilton, 1st Baronet, of Woodbrook (1755–1835), British and Portuguese general of the Napoleonic Wars
John Fane Charles Hamilton (1829–1864), British naval officer, after whom the town of Hamilton in New Zealand is named
John Patrick Hamilton (1896–1961), Australian recipient of the Victoria Cross
John Brown Hamilton (1896–1973), Scottish recipient of the Victoria Cross
John Graham Hamilton (1910–1994), British admiral
John Hamilton (RNZAF officer), former Chief of the Royal New Zealand Air Force

Nobility 
John Hamilton of Cadzow, 4th Laird of Cadzow (before 1370 – c. 1402) Scottish nobleman and soldier
John Hamilton, 1st Marquess of Hamilton (c. 1535–1604), Scottish nobleman
John Hamilton, 1st Lord Bargany (died 1658), Scottish peer
John Hamilton, 4th Earl of Haddington (1626–1669), Scottish nobleman
John Hamilton, 1st Lord Belhaven and Stenton (died 1679), Scottish peer
John Hamilton, 2nd Lord Bargany (c. 1640–1693), Scottish peer and soldier
John Hamilton, 2nd Lord Belhaven and Stenton (1656–1708), Scottish politician and critic of the 1707 Acts of Union
John Hamilton, 1st Marquess of Abercorn (1756–1818), Scottish nobleman
John Hamilton, 1st Baron Hamilton of Dalzell (1829–1900), Scottish soldier and politician
John Hamilton, 1st Viscount Sumner (1859–1934), British law lord
John d'Henin Hamilton, 3rd Baron Hamilton of Dalzell (1911–1990), Lord Lieutenant of Surrey

Politics

Canada
John Hamilton (Ontario politician) (1802–1882), Canadian Senator representing Ontario
John Robinson Hamilton (1808–1870), Canadian lawyer and political figure in Quebec
John Hamilton (Quebec politician) (1827–1888), Canadian Senator representing Quebec
John Claude Hamilton (1854–?), Canadian politician
John Borden Hamilton (1913–2005), Canadian lawyer and politician

U.K.
John Hamilton (1656–1713), MP for Dungannon and Augher
John Hamilton (Donegal MP), MP for St Johnstown and Donegal Borough
John Hamilton (Wendover MP) (1685–1757), English MP for Wendover
John Hamilton (died 1757), MP for Dundalk and Carlow Borough
John Hamilton (1715–1796), Scottish politician, MP for Wigtown Burghs and Wigtownshire
John Hamilton (1751–1804), Scottish politician, MP for Haddingtonshire
John Hamilton (Liverpool) (1922–2006), Leader of Liverpool City Council 1983–1986

U.S.
John Hamilton (New Jersey politician) (c. 1681–1747), American politician
John Hamilton (congressman) (1754–1837), American politician and Pennsylvania Congressman
John Taylor Hamilton (1843–1925), US Representative from Iowa
John Marshall Hamilton (1847–1905), governor of Illinois
John M. Hamilton (1855–1916), US Representative from West Virginia
John Hamilton (Kansas politician) (c. 1892–1973), American politician and chairman of the Republican National Committee
John H. Hamilton Jr. (1919–1986), Pennsylvania politician

Other political figures
John Hamilton (Tasmanian politician) (1834–1924), member of Tasmanian House of Assembly 1891–1903
John Hamilton (Queensland politician) (1841–1916), member of the Queensland Legislative Assembly
John Ronald Hamilton (1871–1940), New Zealand politician

Religion 
John Hamilton (archbishop of St Andrews) (1512–1571), Scottish politician, Archbishop of St Andrews, Keeper of the Privy Seal
John Hamilton (controversialist) (1547–1611), Scottish Catholic controversialist
John Hamilton of Blair (born c. 1640), 17th century Church of Scotland minister and bishop
John Hamilton (priest) (died 1756), Irish Anglican priest
John William Hamilton (1845–1934), American, Bishop of the Methodist Episcopal Church

Sports

Association football
John Hamilton (footballer, born 1880) (1880–?), Scottish footballer for West Ham United
Johnny Hamilton (footballer, born 1935) (1935–2013), Scottish footballer for Heart of Midlothian
Johnny Hamilton (footballer, born 1949) (1949–2015), Scottish footballer for Hibernian and Rangers
Jock Hamilton (A. John Hamilton, 1869–1931), Scottish footballer for Ayr, Wolverhampton Wanderers, Loughborough, Bristol City, Leicester Fosse, Watford, Wellingborough & Fulham
Jock Hamilton (footballer, born 1879) (John H. Hamilton, 1879–1925), Scottish footballer for Leith Athletic, Leeds City and Brentford, among others

Other sports
John Hamilton (cricketer) (1855–1904), English cricketer
John Hamilton (footballer, born 1891) (1891–1964), Australian rules footballer for Fitzroy
J. H. Hamilton (John H. Hamilton), Negro league infielder in the 1920s
J. C. Hamilton (John C. Hamilton), Negro league baseball player in the 1940s
John Hamilton (footballer, born 1946) (1946–2007), Australian rules footballer for Melbourne
Johnny Hamilton (basketball) (born 1994), Trinidadian basketball player

Others 
John Hamilton (architect)  (1761–1812), architect and builder in Edinburgh's First New Town, uncle of Thomas Hamilton
John Church Hamilton (1792–1882), son of the American founding father Alexander Hamilton
John B. Hamilton (1847–1898), U.S. Surgeon General
John Hamilton (university chancellor) (1851–1939), Quebec merchant and chancellor of Bishop's University, Lennoxville, Quebec
John Hamilton (farmer), Scottish sheep farming pioneer in Patagonia and landowner in the Falkland Islands
John Hamilton (gangster) (1899–1934), Canadian murderer and bank-robber and associate of John Dillinger
John Randle Hamilton (born 1944), American diplomat
John Maxwell Hamilton (born 1947), journalist, civil servant and educator
John Hamilton (judge), judge of the Supreme Court of New South Wales, Australia, 1997–2009

Jon Hamilton, scientist and NPR correspondent

See also
Jack Hamilton (disambiguation)
Hamilton House (South Berwick, Maine)